The Trinidad and Tobago national under-20 football team is the under-20 youth team for the Trinidad and Tobago national football team.

Current squad
 The following players were called up for the 2022 CONCACAF U-20 Championship.
 Match dates: 18 June – 3 July 2022
 Caps and goals correct as of:' 19 June 2022
 Names in italics denote players who have been capped for the senior team.''

References

Caribbean national under-20 association football teams
Football in Trinidad and Tobago
u20